Dario Seixas Filho (born March 11, 1971) is a rock bass player, who most recently played with the multi-platinum band Jack Russell's Great White.  He has also toured with the hard rock band Firehouse and recorded their 2003 release Prime Time. He has been credited by the Brazilian media as the first Brazilian musician to play in a top hard rock band. Seixas has also toured with metal legend Stephen Pearcy of RATT, and is a current member of the bands Goodbye Thrill and Crown of Thorns. His stage presence and bass tricks have earned him the reputation of a "not to miss" performer.

Early years 

Dario Seixas was born and raised in Niteroi, Rio de Janeiro, Brazil. The son of Dario Seixas and Suelly Motta Seixas, Seixas started playing bass at age 14, inspired by the performance of rock band KISS at his home town in 1983.
He studied three years of music theory at the Brazilian Conservatory of Music of Rio de Janeiro and had lessons with multiple bass teachers. At age 17 he decided that he needed to move to the States in order to play hard rock, which was not popular in Brazil at the time. At 19 he sold everything he had and followed his dreams to America.

Musical history 

 1990 – Arrives in Atlanta, GA, where he tours the South with the cover band First Wish.
 1992 – Moves to Minneapolis to play with the band Strickland, and is quickly recruited by Chainsaw Cain (Slave Raider) for his new high-energy project, U.K.I.
 1997 – Relocates to L.A. looking for new musical horizons.
 1998 – Scores an audition with one of his guitar heroes, Steve Vai. The audition goes well, but Vai decides to keep his existing bass player.
 1999 – Forms a project named Drastic Party with Dread Zeppelin guitar player Carl Jah.
 2001 – Joins Jive recording artist Amsterdam for a US tour opening for Ratt.
 2002 – Records an album with Glass Wolfe, featuring Phillip Wolfe (Impellitteri, Wasp) on keys, Howie Simon (Jeff Scott Sotto), on guitar and Stefan Svensson on drums.
 2003 – Joins multi-platinum band Firehouse and records their critically acclaimed album "Prime Time". Tours extensively with the band and shares the stage with rock and roll greats, such as Poison, Skid Row, Vince Neil, Great White, Sammy Hagar, Lynyrd Skynyrd, Loverboy, GrandFunk Railroad, L.A. Guns, Quiet Riot, Dokken, Night Ranger and XYZ. Seixas parts ways with the band later that year.
 2004 – Tours Brazil with an early version of Goodbye Thrill, at the time called Monkey Bite. This line-up includes Gustavo Monsanto, Marco Ferreira and Alex Ferreira. They perform live at a popular local TV Show.
 2004 – Plays a few shows with Anthrax's original singer, Neil Turbin, including a couple of dates with King's X. Personal differences split the band.
 2006 - Records female Argentinian guitar sensation Carina Alfie's album "Electric Fuzz." Sessions are done at Steve Vai's Mothership Studio. This album includes Linda McDonald from Phantom Blue.
 2007 – Joins Kivel Records artist Goodbye Thrill. They play, amongst others, the now infamous, "Melodicrock.com Fest #1" alongside many popular acts such as Nelson and Jeff Scott Soto.
 2009 – Joins Takara as lead singer and bass player.
 2009 – Goodbye Thrill opens for Dokken, Skid Row, Bret Michaels and other acts at Rockfest in Iowa. They also go into the studio to record their new release.
 2009 – Seixas joins Stephen Pearcy of RATT on his solo tour.
 2010 – Goodbye Thrill releases a full-length DVD and new album.
 2010 – Seixas begins writing material for a solo album.
 2011 – Joins Crown of Thorns on their European tour.
 2011 – Is named Jack Russell's Great White's new bass player.
 2012 – Begins Jack Russell's Great White "High Seas World Tour".
 2013 – Quits Jack Russell's Great White.

Discography

 2001 Glass Wolfe – Glass Wolfe
 2003 Firehouse – Prime Time
 2005 Glass Wolfe – Predator
 2007 Carina Alfie – Electric Fuzz
 2010 Goodbye Thrill – Keepsakes (DVD)
 2010 Goodbye Thrill – Outrageous
 2013 Ferreira - 5
 2013 Herman Rarebell & Friends - Acoustic Fever

References

External links
http://www.seixas.com

1971 births
Living people
Brazilian bass guitarists
Male bass guitarists
Glam metal musicians
FireHouse (band) members
21st-century bass guitarists